Enedina Arellano Félix de Toledo (born April 12, 1961) is a Mexican drug lord who, alongside her brothers, founded the Tijuana Cartel and played a role as a logistical accountant for the criminal organization.

Throughout most of the 1990s, the Tijuana Cartel was headed by her six brothers, while Enedina advised and helped them in money laundering and financial administration. But after the fall of a financial mastermind in the cartel in the year 2000, Enedina took up the position. She first started working behind the scenes as a money launderer for the Tijuana Cartel but then ended up leading the cartel after the arrest of her brother Eduardo Arellano Félix in 2008.

Since most of her brothers are either incarcerated or deceased, Enedina has managed the financial aspect of the organization, overseen alliances, and taken the lead of the Tijuana Cartel alongside Luis Fernando (before his capture in 2014). Her historical contacts with drug suppliers in Colombia managed to keep the organization afloat.

Early life
Enedina Arellano Félix was born in Mazatlán, Sinaloa, on April 12, 1961, in a family of drug traffickers. In 1977, when she was sixteen, Enedina reportedly harbored a dream of becoming the Mazatlán Carnival Queen but abandoned it after her two brothers, Ramón and Benjamín, were wanted by the United States and the Mexican government. During that time, her older brothers were working for Miguel Ángel Félix Gallardo, who would eventually give them the drug corridor in Tijuana, Baja California.

Criminal career
Enedina enrolled at a private university in Guadalajara, Jalisco, graduating with a bachelor's degree in accounting. By the mid 1980s, Enedina was working with the family business, but was never considered by the authorities as a visible head in the Tijuana Cartel. Nonetheless, after the fall of the former cartel's financial brain, Jesús Labra Avilés, alias El Chuy, in the year 2000, Enedina began to directly manage the money laundering activities of the criminal organization.

Family members in the Tijuana Cartel
Enedina is the sister of former cartel leaders Benjamín, Carlos, Eduardo, Francisco Javier, Francisco Rafael and Ramón. Luis Fernando Sánchez Arellano captured in 2014, the son of Alicia,  Enedina's husband, Luis Raúl Toledo Carrejo, was accused by the United States Department of Treasury in the year 2005 for having links with the Tijuana Cartel. Alicia Arellano Félix, the sister of Enedina, is currently a leader in the Tijuana Cartel.

Cartel workings
Since the apprehension of Benjamín in 2002, the Mexican government was able to severely undermine the Tijuana Cartel but failed to destroy it. Enedina has been a leader in the organization since 2003. After the arrest of Eduardo in 2008, Enedina finally became the leader of the Tijuana clan along with her nephew.

Enedina has helped contribute a more "business-like vision" instead of the old and violent practices of her brothers, who previously led the Tijuana Cartel before they were arrested or killed. She forged alliances with other criminal organizations, as opposed to her brothers, who often resorted to violence. The Drug Enforcement Administration (DEA) and the Mexican media identify Enedina as the first and one of the few women to lead a criminal organization in the world other than Sandra Avila Beltran in Mexico, activities historically reserved for men.

Enedina has several aliases, including: La Jefa, La Madrina, and La Narcomami. The authorities in the United States and Mexico consider Enedina the "financial brains" of the Tijuana Cartel.

Kingpin Act
In June 2000, the United States Department of the Treasury sanctioned Enedina under the Foreign Narcotics Kingpin Designation Act.

In media
Enedina Arellano Félix is portrayed in Narcos: Mexico by Mayra Hermosillo.

See also
Griselda Blanco
Illegal drug trade
Mexican Drug War

References

Bibliography
 
 

1961 births
People from Mazatlán
20th-century Mexican businesswomen
20th-century Mexican businesspeople
Mexican crime bosses
Mexican female criminals
Female organized crime figures
Tijuana Cartel traffickers
Living people
People sanctioned under the Foreign Narcotics Kingpin Designation Act
21st-century Mexican businesswomen
21st-century Mexican businesspeople